Hayashiya is a surname. Notable people with the surname include:

Kikuō Hayashiya (born 1937), Japanese comedian
Sanpei Hayashiya I (1925–1980), Japanese comedian
Hayashiya Sanpei II (born 1970), Japanese comedian
Hayashiya Shōzō IX (born 1962), Japanese storyteller, actor, and voice actor

Rakugoka